This article contains notable highlights from the 2008 Summer Paralympics in Beijing, China.

Calendar

September 6
 Opening Ceremony

Day 1: September 7

 The first gold medal of the Beijing Paralympics went to Slovakia's Veronika Vadovicova in shooting, in the 10 metre air rifle competition.
 In swimming, Natalie du Toit of South Africa won gold in the 100 metre butterfly event. The United States won four of the sixteen gold medals available in swimming on day one, more than any other country.
 After a strong performance at the Olympics, Great Britain won gold in all three of the first day events it had entered in cycling, with Simon Richardson, Darren Kenny, and the duo of Aileen McGlynn and Ellen Hunter.
 Of the four gold medals available for the first day in judo, the two women's went to China (Guo Huaping and Cui Na) and the two men's to Algeria (Mouloud Noura and Sidali Lamri), with all four wins being reported as unexpected.

Day 2: September 8
The women's T54 5000 metre race in athletics was marred by a spectacular crash just before the final lap, when six athletes collided in a pile-up, several of them damaging their wheelchairs in the process and thus being left unable to complete the race. The crash was reported to have been caused by Swiss athlete Edith Hunkeler colliding with fellow Swiss athlete Sandra Graf, whereupon athletes behind them piled up over them. Hunkeler suffered a broken collarbone in the accident. Reaching the 50 metre mark, remaining competitors were then impeded by officials running across the track to assist fallen athletes. The race was won by Canada's Diane Roy, and the medal ceremony was completed, before IPC officials announced that they had ruled in favour of an appeal lodged by three countries, and cancelled the results. Medallists were asked to relinquish their medals, and the race was rescheduled for September 12 (with Hunkeler being disqualified), amidst significant controversy.
13-year-old Eleanor Simmonds of Great Britain became the youngest ever individual Paralympic gold medallist when she won the 100m freestyle S6 event in swimming.
Osamah Alshanqiti won Saudi Arabia's first ever Paralympic or Olympic gold medal, in the F12 triple jump, with a world record jump of 15.37 metres.
The People's Republic of China relay team of Zong Kai, Zhao Ji, Zhang Lixin & Li Huzhao sets a new world record of 49.89 seconds in round 1, heat 1 of the men's 4 × 100 m, T53-54.

Day 3: September 9
Great Britain won five more gold medals in cycling, bringing its total to nine golds and one silver in cycling. Of Britain's six cycling competitors on day 3, five took gold and the sixth, Rik Waddon, took silver behind fellow British athlete Darren Kenny in the 1 km CP3 time trial.
Haider Ali won Pakistan's first ever Paralympic medal, a silver in the F37/38 long jump, with a world record jump. Farhat Chida of Tunisia broke Ali's new world record to take gold.
Laurentia Tan won Singapore's first ever Paralympic medal, a bronze in equestrian in the individual championship test Grade Ia.
Oscar Pistorius of South Africa won the first of his three targeted gold medals, in the T44 100 metre sprint in athletics.
Chantal Petitclerc of Canada sets a Paralympic record of 16.07 seconds in round 1, heat 1 of the women's 100m, T54.
Men's 4 × 100 m relay, T53-54 – China (Zong Kai, Zhao Ji, Zhang Lixin & Li Huzhao) won in 49.90, ahead of Thailand (Supachoi Koysub, Konjen, Prawat Wahoram & Pichet Krungget), 51.93 and Republic of Korea (Hong Suk-Man, Jung Dong-Ho, Kim Gyu-Dae & Yoo Byung-Hoon), 53.52.
Pakistani powerlifter Ahmed Butt was the first athlete to be expelled from the Beijing Paralympics after testing positive for steroid use.

Day 4: September 10
Women's 100m, T54 – Chantal Petitclerc of Canada won in 16.15 seconds, ahead of Liu Wenjun, China, 16.20 and Dong Hongjiao, China, 16.24.
Men's 400m, T54—Zhang Lixin, China won in 45.07 seconds, a new world record, ahead of David Weir, Britain, 46.02 and Saichon Konjen, Thailand, 46.86.

Day 5: September 11
Women's 200m Individual Medley, SM9 - Natalie Du Toit from Republic of South Africa won with a world record of 2 minutes and 27.83 seconds, ahead of Stephanie Dixon, Canada, 2:37.54, and Louise Watkin, Great Britain, 2:40.31.

Day 6: September 12
Women's 400m, T54 – Chantal Petitclerc of Canada won in 52.02 seconds, ahead of Tatyana McFadden, United States, 53.49 and Diane Roy, Canada, 54.72.
Zhang Lixin of China sets a world record of 24.18 seconds in round 1, heat 2 of the men's 200m, T54.
Men's 400m, T52 - Tomoya Ito of Japan won in 57.25 seconds (Paralympic Record) ahead of Toshihiro Takada, Japan, 60.32 and Dean Bergeron, Canada, 60.43 seconds.

Day 7: September 13
Lindsey Carmichael of Lago Vista, Texas, Standing Recurve Female Archer for USA, won the first medal in archery by an American woman ever at a Paralympics, shooting the highest score of the recurve medal matches (105 out of a possible 120) and the first medal in archery for the US during both the Beijing Olympics & Paralympics.

Day 8: September 14
Women's 200m, T54 – Chantal Petitclerc, Canada, won in 27.52 seconds (setting a world record), ahead of Tatyana McFadden, United States, 28.43 and Manuela Schar, Switzerland, 28.84.
Women's 800m, T54 – Petitclerc won in 1:45.19 (a new world record), ahead of McFadden, USA, 1:46.95 and Diane Roy, Canada, 1:48.07.
Men's 200m, T54 -- Zhang Lixin, China, won in 24.34, ahead of Saichon Konjen, Thailand, 25.15 and Leo-Pekka Tahti, Finland, 25.17
Men's 4 × 400 m relay, T53-54 – China (Cui Yangfeng, Zhao Ji, Li Huzhao & Zhang Lixin) won in 3:05.67 (a new world record), ahead of Thailand (Koysub, Wahoram, Krungget & Saichon Konjen), 3:11.63 and France (Julien Casoli, Pierre Fairbank, Alain Fuss & Denis Lemeunier), 3 :17.93. It is Zhang Lixin's fourth gold medal of the Games, and all with new world record times during the competition.
As the cycling competitions come to a close, Great Britain has by far dominated the events, winning seventeen gold medals.

Day 9: September 15
Francis Kompaon wins Papua New Guinea's first ever Paralympic or Olympic medal - a silver in the Men's 100m (T46), in athletics. Kompaon finishes second to Australia's Heath Francis by 0.05 seconds.

Day 10: September 16
 Women's 1500m, T54 – Chantal Petitclerc of Canada wins her fifth gold medal of the Games in 3:39.88, ahead of Shelly Woods, Britain, 3:40.99 and Edith Hunkeler, Switzerland, 3:41.03.
 Oscar Pistorius of South Africa wins the third of his three targeted gold medals, in the Men's 400m - T44 category, in athletics.
 Men's 800m, T52 - Tomoya Ito of Japan won his second gold medal of the Games in 1:53.42, ahead of Toshihiro Takada, Japan, 1:53.67 and Thomas Geierspichler, Austria, 1:56.26. Tomoya Ito marked world record at round 1

Day 11: September 17

 Closing Ceremony
The Beijing 2008 Paralympic Games came to close on 17 September. Taking the theme ‘A Letter to the Future’ the Ceremony featured about 2,000 performers. 
London, the host of the 2012 Paralympic Games, staged an eight-minute performance and aimed to show how sport can promote the Paralympic Movement and positively influence young people's lives.

See also
2008 Summer Paralympics medal table
Chronological summary of the 2008 Summer Olympics

References

Chronological
Chronological summaries of the Paralympics